Mehrdasht (also known as Khātūnlar (Persian: خاتون لر), Şāleḩābād (Persian: صالح اباد), and Khātūnlar Va Şāleḩābād) is a village in Bibi Sakineh Rural District, in the Central District of Malard County, Tehran Province, Iran. At the 2006 census, its population was 1,985, in 490 families.

References 

Populated places in Malard County